Canada Clause may refer to:

Article 2 of the North Atlantic Treaty, 1949
Section 23 of the Canadian Charter of Rights and Freedoms, 1982
A clause in the proposed Charlottetown Accord, 1992